Kurt Dunder is a Danish comics series written and drawn by Frank Madsen. It was created in 1986.

Concept

The series is about an adventurer, Kurt Dunder, who travels around the world, along with his friend Bill Milton and Attila the monkey, to solve strange mysteries and riddles. It is drawn in the ligne claire style and published by Eudor Comics. So far, two albums have been translated in English, namely "Kurt Dunder in Tirol" in 2000 and "Kurt Dunder in Africa" in 2015.

Other media
In 2008, Catooz made Kurt Dunder in Africa available through Nokia's OVI-portal as 10 downloadable chapters. In 2015, Eudor Comics made Kurt Dunder in Africa available for Amazon Kindle (English edition).

Short stories
Den månesyge Mumie (1993, published in the anthology Gale Streger no. 6. Written by Ingo Milton, layouted by Frank Madsen and drawn by Sussi Bech. 6 pages.)
Kurt Dunder & Nanobotterne (2002–03, published in the comics magazine Kurt Dunder & Kompagni)
Kurt Dunder & Nazi-guldet (2008, Eudor Comics. 24 pages.)
Kurt Dunder i Alaska (2010, published in the newspaper Nya Upplagan. Story by Peter Becher. 4 pages.)

Full stories
Kurt Dunder i Afrika (1991, Carlsen Comics)
Kurt Dunder i Grønland (1994, Carlsen Comics)
Kurt Dunder i Tyrol (2000, Carlsen Comics)

External links 
Frank Madsen Studio
Eudor Comics
Frank Madsen biography, in English
Frank Madsen interview, in English. Conducted October 2014

Danish comic strips
1988 comics debuts
Adventure comics
Fictional Danish people
Comics characters introduced in 1988